American Psycho is the fourth studio album by the American punk rock band Misfits. Released on May 13, 1997, it was the first to be recorded and released without the band's founder and former leader Glenn Danzig. Bassist Jerry Only, after years of litigation, reached a settlement with Danzig and was granted the rights to use the band's name and image to record and perform. The album also marked the addition of singer Michale Graves and Dr. Chud on drums.

Originally, the album was going to be titled Dead Kings Rise, a play on the band's resurrection, but was changed when the title track did not make the album. The album was produced by New York City based musician Daniel Rey, who had previously worked with artists such as King Missile and the Ramones.

Reception 

Entertainment Weekly wrote that "their goofy formula of lyrics inspired by bad horror movies, poppy vocals, and blasting hardcore is still excellent mosh-pit fodder."

Track listing

Personnel 
 Michale Graves – vocals
 Doyle Wolfgang von Frankenstein – guitar
 Jerry Only – bass
 Dr. Chud – drums, keyboards on tracks 1, 3, 4, 8, and 10
 Daniel Rey – keyboards on track 7

Chart positions

References 

Misfits (band) albums
1997 albums
Geffen Records albums
Albums produced by Daniel Rey